Montgomery Oliver Koelsch (March 5, 1912 – September 1, 1992) was a United States circuit judge of the United States Court of Appeals for the Ninth Circuit.

Education and career

Born in Boise, Idaho, Koelsch received a Bachelor of Arts degree in history from the University of Washington in Seattle, Washington, in 1932 and a Bachelor of Laws from the University of Washington School of Law in 1935. He was an attorney in private practice in Idaho in Boise from 1936 to 1950 and served as assistant prosecutor for Ada County, Idaho from 1939 to 1945. Koelsch then served as a state judge in the third district from 1951 to 1959, filling a vacancy after his father Charles (1872–1965) retired from the bench.

Federal judicial service

Koelsch was nominated by President Dwight D. Eisenhower on September 12, 1959, to a seat on the United States Court of Appeals for the Ninth Circuit vacated by Judge James Alger Fee. He was confirmed by the United States Senate on September 14, 1959, and received his commission on September 23, 1959. He assumed senior status due to a certified disability on January 31, 1976. His service terminated on September 1, 1992, due to his death in Seattle. His ashes were scattered in Idaho.

References

External links
 

1912 births
1992 deaths
Judges of the United States Court of Appeals for the Ninth Circuit
United States court of appeals judges appointed by Dwight D. Eisenhower
20th-century American judges
University of Washington College of Arts and Sciences alumni
University of Washington School of Law alumni
Idaho lawyers
People from Boise, Idaho